Rumeshteh (also Romanized as Rūmeshteh, Roomooshtah, Rowmeshteh, and Rūmasheteh) is a village in Firuzabad Rural District, Firuzabad District, Selseleh County, Lorestan Province, Iran. At the 2006 census, its population was 349, in 72 families.

References 

Towns and villages in Selseleh County